Comco Ikarus GmbH  is a German aircraft manufacturer. The company produced hang gliders through the late 1970s, followed by ultralight aircraft, Flight Rescue System (FRS)-branded ballistic parachutes, and light aircraft.

Aircraft

References

External links

Aircraft manufacturers of Germany
Vehicle manufacturing companies established in 1970
1970 establishments in West Germany